The Soldiers and Sailors Memorial Arch in Bushnell Park, Hartford, Connecticut, honors the 4,000 Hartford citizens who served in the American Civil War, including 400 who died for the Union cause. It is notable as the first permanent triumphal arch to be built in America.

History

The arch's conception dates from October 21, 1879, when a committee formed to sponsor a competition (held in 1881). The committee declined to approve any of the winning schemes and in 1884 awarded the commission to the Hartford based architect George Keller. He produced an eclectic design with two Norman towers flanking a Gothic arch, decorated with a classical frieze, embellished with statues modeled by the Swiss-born sculptor Albert Entress (1846-1926). The arch, built with brownstone from Portland, Connecticut, was completed in 1886 at a cost of about $60,000, and dedicated on September 17, 1886. 

The north frieze, by Samuel James Kitson, tells a story of war with (on the right) a figure of General Ulysses S. Grant surveying his troops and (on the left) marines leaping from a boat to rush Confederate troops. The south frieze, by Caspar Buberl, tells a story of peace. The central female allegorical figure represents the City of Hartford, surrounded by her citizens welcoming their soldiers home. The Boston Terra Cotta Company fabricated the frieze.

The four military services are symbolized in the spandrels: an anchor for the Navy; a crossed cannon for the Artillery; crossed sabers for the Cavalry; and crossed rifles for the Infantry. Six sculptural figures, each eight feet tall, adorn the towers: farmer, blacksmith, mason, student, carpenter and an African-American breaking his chains of bondage. Angels in the form of finials cap the towers, one a trumpeter, the other a cymbalist, both facing south to welcome the returning troops. During the restoration of 1986–1988, the original terra cotta angels were removed and replaced with copies in bronze.

The ashes of architect Keller and his wife Mary are interred in the memorial.

Inscriptions

A tablet on the southeast tower is inscribed: 

The southwest tablet is inscribed:

Gallery

References 

 
 Bushnell Park Foundation

1885 sculptures
Buildings and structures in Hartford, Connecticut
George Keller buildings
Triumphal arches in the United States
Union (American Civil War) monuments and memorials in Connecticut